Parallel Colt is a set of multithreaded version of Colt.  It is a collection of open-source libraries for High Performance Scientific and Technical Computing written in Java. It contains all the original capabilities of Colt and adds several new ones, with a focus on multi-threaded algorithms.

Capabilities 
Parallel Colt has all the capabilities of the original Colt library, with the following additions.

 Multithreading
 Specialized Matrix data structures
 JPlasma
 Java port of PLASMA (Parallel Linear Algebra for Scalable Multi-core Architectures).
 CSparseJ
 CSparseJ is a Java port of CSparse (a Concise Sparse matrix package).
 Netlib-java
 Netlib is a collection of mission-critical software components for linear algebra systems (i.e. working with vectors or matrices).
 Solvers and preconditioners
 Mostly adapted from Matrix Toolkit Java
 Nonlinear Optimization
 Java translations of the 1-dimensional minimization routine from the MINPACK
 Matrix reader/writer
 All classes that use floating-point arithmetic are implemented in single and double precision.
 Parallel quicksort algorithm

Usage Example 
Example of Singular Value Decomposition (SVD):
DenseDoubleAlgebra alg = new DenseDoubleAlgebra();
DenseDoubleSingularValueDecomposition s = alg.svd(matA);

DoubleMatrix2D U = s.getU();
DoubleMatrix2D S = s.getS();
DoubleMatrix2D V = s.getV();

Example of matrix multiplication:
DenseDoubleAlgebra alg = new DenseDoubleAlgebra();
DoubleMatrix2D result = alg.mult(matA,matB);

References 

Java (programming language) libraries